Dolomite may refer to:

Dolomite (mineral), a carbonate mineral
Dolomite (rock), also known as dolostone, a sedimentary carbonate rock 
Dolomite, Alabama, United States, an unincorporated community
Dolomite, California, United States, an unincorporated community
Dolomites, a section of the Alps
Triumph Dolomite (1934–1940), a sporting car made by Triumph Motor Company
Triumph Dolomite, a small car made by the British Leyland Corporation in the 1970s and 1980s
Manila Bay Beach, informally known as "Dolomite Beach", an urban artificial beach in Manila, Philippines

See also
Dolemite, 1975 blaxploitation feature film and the name of its principal character
Shaolin Dolemite, a 1999 in-name-only sequel to Dolemite
"Dolemite", the opening track on Tore Down House, a 1997 album by Scott Henderson; the track features samples from the film
Dolemite Is My Name, 2019 American biographical comedy film
Dolomiten, a German-language newspaper published in South Tyrol, Italy

sl:Dolomit